Congo Express was a regional airline created through a joint venture with South African Airlines (SA Express) and BizAfrika Congo, in the Democratic Republic of the Congo. The airline's long-term strategy is to transform air transport in the region, stimulate markets and economic growth in mining and other growth sectors, develop hubs, and provide important links between lucrative destinations.

History
Congo Express was the first domestic airline in the Democratic Republic of Congo (DRC). It commenced operations on 1 February 2010, operating seven days a week and on three routes flying out of Kinshasa, and multiple routes out of South Africa into Lubumbashi. The airline operations leveraged the South African platform, and under the managing director Didier Kindambu, flourished into a regional airline serving the business and diplomatic communities. The business community in DRC had access to Lubumbashi within a few hours; it previously took 3-4 days to reach this region on dilapidated roads.

Destinations
Kinshasa - N'djili Airport 
Lubumbashi - Lubumbashi International Airport, base

Fleet
The Congo Express fleet consisted of the following aircraft as of April 2012:

See also
 List of airlines of the Democratic Republic of the Congo
 South African Express

References

External links
 
 

Lubumbashi
Defunct airlines of the Democratic Republic of the Congo